Francesco Bega (born 26 October 1974, in Milan) is a retired Italian footballer who played as a defender. He currently works as team manager for his former team Genoa.

External links
Profile at Lega-Calcio.it

Living people
Italian footballers
Italian expatriate footballers
Expatriate footballers in Switzerland
A.C. Monza players
Cosenza Calcio 1914 players
Virtus Bergamo Alzano Seriate 1909 players
Como 1907 players
U.S. Triestina Calcio 1918 players
Cagliari Calcio players
Genoa C.F.C. players
Brescia Calcio players
FC Lugano players
Serie A players
Serie B players
Serie C players
1974 births
Association football defenders